Tang Mengni (born 8 April 1994) is a Chinese competitor in synchronised swimming.

She has won 3 silver medals at the 2015 World Aquatics Championships, as well as 2 gold medals at the 2014 Asian Games.

References
Asian Games Profile

External links

Living people
Chinese synchronized swimmers
1994 births
World Aquatics Championships medalists in synchronised swimming
Synchronized swimmers from Shanghai
Artistic swimmers at the 2014 Asian Games
Asian Games medalists in artistic swimming
Synchronized swimmers at the 2015 World Aquatics Championships
Synchronized swimmers at the 2016 Summer Olympics
Olympic synchronized swimmers of China
Olympic silver medalists for China
Olympic medalists in synchronized swimming
Medalists at the 2016 Summer Olympics
Asian Games gold medalists for China
Medalists at the 2014 Asian Games
Synchronized swimmers at the 2017 World Aquatics Championships